PowerVault is a line of data storage and backup products formerly from Dell, and currently for Dell EMC.

After Dell acquired EqualLogic for its iSCSI products in 2008, and Compellent Technologies in 2011, the PowerVault line was positioned as less expensive than the other product lines.

Direct Attached Storage

Older Equipment 
 200S - 1998
210S - Used SCSI
 220S - Used SCSI

Storage Area Network 
Includes the PowerVault MD 3200i, 3220i, 3400, 3420, 3460 for 1 Gbit/s iSCSI, MD 3800I, 3820I, and 3860I for 10 Gbit/s iSCSI, and the MD 3800f, 3820f, and 3860f for Fibre Channel.

Older Equipment 
 630F
 650F - 1998
 660F

Network Attached Storage 

701N - 2001
705N
715N
725N - 2002
735N - 2001
745N - 2004
770N - 2002
775N - 2002

With Windows Storage Server 2012 R2 operating system:
NX400 / NX430 / NX440
NX3200 / NX3230 / NX3240
NX3300 / NX3330 / NX3340

Tape Storage

DDS4 
100T DDS4
120T DDS4

DLT 
 110T DLT1
110T DLT7000

LTO 
 110T LTO-1
 110T LTO-2
 112T LTO-2
 114T/114X
 122T LTO
 124T
 128T LTO
 130T
 132T
 136T LTO-2
 ML6000
 TL2000 - Uses the same chassis build as the IBM TS3100. Components, including drives in many cases, can be interchanged between the two models, including the TL4000. 
 TL4000 - Uses the same chassis build as the IBM TS3200. Components, including drives in many cases, can be interchanged between the two models, including the TL2000.

References

External links

PowerVault
PowerVault
PowerVault